MV  Asian Glory is a UK flagged automobile transport ship.

Hijacking 
On 2 January 2010 the Asian Glory was hijacked by pirates 1,000 km off the Horn of Africa.

The pirates used a Pakistani vessel, to hijack Asian Glory; however, they later freed the Pakistani vessel and its 29 crew on board.

Although it is registered in the United Kingdom, no British citizens were on board the South Korean operated ship.

Vessel released June 11, 2010.

See also
EUKOR
Hyundai Glovis

References 

Piracy in Somalia
Cargo ships of the United Kingdom
1994 ships